The 2015 King George VI and Queen Elizabeth Stakes was a horse race held at Ascot Racecourse on Saturday 25 July 2015. It was the 65th King George VI and Queen Elizabeth Stakes.

The winner was Mohammed Obaid Al Maktoum's Postponed, a four-year-old bay colt trained at Newmarket, Suffolk by Luca Cumani and ridden by Andrea Atzeni. Postponed's victory was the first in the race for his owner, trainer and jockey.

The contenders
The race attracted seven runners, six from England and one from Italy. The race was hit by several late withdrawals: the 2014 runner-up Telescope was taken out of the race following an injury and there were no challengers from France after Flintshire was withdrawn on the day before the race. The most notable absentee however, was the Epsom Derby winner Golden Horn who was withdrawn a few hours before post time by his trainer John Gosden who felt that the prevailing soft, sticky ground would not suit the colt. Even without the Derby winner, Gosden's stable was strongly represented fielding the King Edward VII Stakes winner Eagle Top and Romsdal, who had finished third in the 2014 Epsom Derby. The other British contenders were the Michael Stoute-trained four-year-old Snow Sky, winner of the Hardwicke Stakes at Royal Ascot, the seven-year-old gelding Clever Cookie (Ormonde Stakes, Postponed (Great Voltigeur Stakes, and the filly Madame Chiang. The Italian challenger was Dylan Mouth who had won nine of his ten races including the (Gran Premio del Jockey Club and the Gran Premio di Milano. The key trial appeared to be the Hardwicke Stakes, in which Snow Sky had defeated Postponed and Eagle Top. Madame Chiang and Dylan Mouth were the only previous Group One winners in the field.

Eagle Top was made the 5/2 favourite ahead of Snow Sky (3/1) Clever Cookie (4/1) and Postponed (6/1). Madame Chiang started at 8/1 with Dylan Mouth on 10/1 and Romsdal being made the 12/1 outsider.

The race
Romsdal went into the lead soon after the start and set the pace from Postponed, Snow Sky and Dylan Mouth. Madame Chiang settled in fifth ahead of Eagle Top, with Clever Cookie, who appeared to be struggling to match the pace of the others, in last place. The order remained the same until the straight where Dylan Mouth began to tire and drifted to the left, forcing Eagle Top, who was beginning to make rapid progress, to the far outside. Postponed overtook Romsdal two furlongs out and went for home along the inside rail.	
Snow Sky and Madame Chiang were unable to quicken, but Eagle Top maintained his momentum on the outside, and moved level with the leader entering the final furlong. Eagle Top gained the advantage 100 yards from the finish but Postponed rallied strongly and the two four-year-old colts crossed the line together. The photo finish showed that Postponed had prevailed by a nose (the narrowest possible margin) with a gap of almost four lengths back to Romsdal in third. Madame Chiang took fourth ahead of Clever Cookie and Snow Sky, with Dylan Mouth eight lengths drift in last place.

Race details
 Sponsor: QIPCO
 Purse: £1,195,196; First prize: £689,027
 Surface: Turf
 Going: Soft
 Distance: 12 furlongs
 Number of runners: 7
 Winner's time: 2:31.25

Full result

 Abbreviations: nse = nose; nk = neck; shd = head; hd = head

Winner's details
Further details of the winner, Postponed
 Sex: Colt
 Foaled: 4 April 2011
 Country: Ireland
 Sire: Dubawi; Dam: Ever Rigg (Dubai Destination)
 Owner: Mohammed Obaid Al Maktoum
 Breeder:  St Albans Bloodstock

Subsequent breeding careers
Leading progeny of participants in the 2015 King George VI and Queen Elizabeth Stakes.

Stallions
Postponed (1st) - Offspring yet to raceSnow Sky (6th) - Offspring yet to raceDylan Mouth (7th) - Standing in EnglandEagle Top (2nd) - Exported to Czech Republic

Broodmare
Madame Chiang (4th) - Minor flat winner

References

King George
 2015
2015 in British sport
King George VI and Queen Elizabeth Stakes
2010s in Berkshire